The 2022–23 FC Lugano season is the club's 115th season in existence and the eighth consecutive season in the top flight of Swiss football. In addition to the domestic league, FC Lugano will participate in this season's edition of the Swiss Cup. The season covers the period from 1 July 2022 to 30 June 2023.

Players

First-team squad

Other players under contract

Out on loan

Pre-season and friendlies

Competitions

Overview

Swiss Super League

League table

Results summary

Results by round

Matches
The league fixtures were announced on 17 June 2022.

Swiss Cup

References

FC Lugano
Lugano